The 1912–13 Penn State Nittany Lions basketball team represented Penn State University during the 1912–13 college men's basketball season. The team finished with a final record of 8–3. The Nittany Lions were not in a conference at this point, but rather they were an NCAA Division I independent schools. The basketball team would join several conferences before joining the Big Ten Conference in 1992-93.

Schedule

|-

References

Penn State Nittany Lions basketball seasons
Penn State
Penn State Nittany Lions Basketball Team
Penn State Nit